Kardeşköy is a small town in the District of Aydın, Aydın Province, Turkey. As of the 2010 Turkish Census, it had a population of 2,309 people.

References

Villages in Efeler District